The Hainanese Transliteration Scheme refers to a romanization scheme published by the Guangdong Provincial Education Department in September 1960 as one of four systems collectively referred to as Guangdong Romanization. The scheme describes the Wenchang dialect spoken in Wenchang, Hainan which is considered to be the prestige dialect of Hainanese. At the time of the scheme's creation, Hainan was part of Guangdong, until it was separated to form its own province in 1988. This system utilises the Latin alphabet with superscript numbers to represent tone.

System

Letters

Initials

Finals

Tones

See also
Guangdong romanization
Hainanese

References

 

Hainan Min
Latin-script orthographies
Romanization of Chinese